Arnaud Geyre (21 April 1935 – 20 February 2018) was a racing cyclist from France who represented his native country at the 1956 Summer Olympics in Melbourne, Australia. There he won the gold medal in the men's team road race, alongside Michel Vermeulin and Maurice Moucheraud, and the silver in the men's individual road race. Geyre was a professional from 1958 to 1963.

References

External links
 

1935 births
2018 deaths
French male cyclists
Cyclists at the 1956 Summer Olympics
Olympic cyclists of France
Olympic gold medalists for France
Olympic silver medalists for France
Sportspeople from Pau, Pyrénées-Atlantiques
Olympic medalists in cycling
Medalists at the 1956 Summer Olympics
Cyclists from Nouvelle-Aquitaine